CATC may refer to:
Chinese Association on Smoking Control
Civil Aviation Technology College
Civil Aviation Training Center, a UNDP-founded facility for training students in private and commercial piloting and regular air service, located in Iran, with bases in Thailand, Tehran, Ahwaz, Mashhad, Shiraz, Esfahan and Tabriz
Confédération Syndicale du Congo
Catapult C Synthesis
Carnitine O-acetyltransferase, an enzyme
CATC AB, A provider of ship automation systems